The 2015 Campeonato Baiano de Futebol was the 111th edition of Bahia's top professional football league. The competition began on 31 January and ended on 3 May. Bahia won the championship for the 46th time.

First phase

Group A

Group B

Relegation playoffs

Quarterfinals

Semifinals

3rd place playoffs

Finals

Bahia won 6–3 on aggregate.

2015 in Brazilian football leagues
Campeonato Baiano